Vangelis Makris (born 27 February 1999) is a Greek professional footballer who plays as a forward for Aiolikos.

References

1999 births
Living people
Greek footballers
Super League Greece 2 players
Levadiakos F.C. players
Association football forwards